Tympanum may refer to:

 Tympanum (architecture), an architectural element located within the arch or pediment
 Tympanum (anatomy), a hearing organ/gland in frogs and toads, a flat red oval on both sides of a frog's head
 Tympanum, in biology, the eardrum
 Tympanum, or tympanal organ, a hearing organ in insects
 Tympanum (hand drum), a percussion instrument in ancient Greece and Rome
 Timpano, in music, singular of timpani, a kettledrum
 Sakia or saqiya, in Latin "tympanum", a water-raising device
 Larnaca Tympanum, a medieval sculpture

See also
Tympanic (disambiguation)